Cylindropsyllidae is a family of copepods belonging to the order Harpacticoida. It was first described by Sars in 1909

Genera

As of 1987, Cylindropsyllidae consists of 17 genera:
 Arenocaris Nicholls, 1935
 Bolbotelos Huys & Conroy-Dalton, 2006
 Boreopontia Willems, 1981
 Boreovermis Huys & Conroy-Dalton, 2006
 Cylindropsyllus Brady, 1880
 Cylinnula Coull, 1971
 Evansula T. Scott 1906
 Leptastacus T. Scott, 1906
 Monsmeteoris Richter, 2019
 Navalonia Huys & Conroy-Dalton, 1993
 Selenopsyllus Moura & Pottek, 1998
 Stenocaris Sars G.O., 1909
 Stenocaropsis Apostolov, 1982
 Paraleptastacus Wilson, 1932
 Psammastacus Nicholls, 1935
 Vermicaris Kornev & Cheroprud, 2008
 Willemsia Huys & Conroy-Dalton, 1993

References

Copepods